John Forbes-Robertson (10 May 1928 – 14 May 2008) was a British actor best known for being the only actor other than Christopher Lee to play Count Dracula for Hammer Film Productions.

He was born in Worthing, Sussex. He was not the son of actor-manager Sir Johnston Forbes-Robertson, as erroneously stated in the press at the time of his death; he was the grandson of one of Sir Johnston's brothers. He began his acting career on the stage, starting at the Intimate Theatre in Palmers Green, before pursuing a film and TV career in the 1950s and 1960s, usually in minor roles, in films such as The Battle of the River Plate (1956), Bunny Lake Is Missing (1965) and The Spy with a Cold Nose (1966). He made two films for Hammer - The Vampire Lovers (1970), as the Man in Black, and The Legend of the 7 Golden Vampires (1974), as Dracula. Other film credits include Nicholas and Alexandra (1971), The Vault of Horror (1973), Venom (1981) and Lifeforce (1985). On TV he appeared in a 1975 episode of Thriller ("The Next Voice You See") and played Leonard Rossiter's love rival, Henry Possett, in The Fall and Rise of Reginald Perrin (1976).

His last appearance on screen was in a documentary, The Legend of Hammer: Vampires (2008), directed by Don Fearney.

Filmography

References

External links
 
 Obituary from The Guardian

English male film actors
English male television actors
1928 births
2008 deaths